Wahlberg's velvet gecko (Homopholis wahlbergii) is a species of large gecko, a lizard in the family Gekkonidae. The species occurs exclusively in Southern Africa.

Etymology
The specific name, wahlbergii, is in honour of Swedish naturalist Johan August Wahlberg.

Geographic range
H. wahlbergii is endemic to Miombo and Mopane bushveld of Botswana, South Africa, Eswatini, Zimbabwe, and Mozambique. The largest part of its range covers Zimbabwe.

Habitat
H. wahlbergii shelters under tree bark, rocks, empty bird nests, and other places in coastal bush and mesic and arid savannas.

Description
Wahlberg's velvet gecko is so called because the skin looks and feels like velvet. The back varies from dark grey to soft grey-brown and may be crossed with paler chevrons or crossbars or have mottled paler areas nestled along the centre of its back and spine.

Behaviour
H. wahlbergii is nocturnal; however, it has been observed to occasionally be active during the day. It ventures far from its usual roost only at night, when courtship generally occurs. It is frequently found in baobab trees and in the roofs and walls of traditional mud-huts and other human dwellings.

Diet
H. wahlbergii is mainly insectivores. Beetles make up the majority of its diet, with butterflies making up the next largest proportion, although it can also consume millipedes.

Breeding
Males and females of H. wahlbergii exhibit little to no sexual dimorphism. Females reproduce annually once they reach sexual maturity. The female lays pairs of large, hard-shelled eggs that start soft and adhesive. Egg length, is not correlated to maternal length. These eggs are concealed under bark overhangs or in rock crevices.

References

Further reading
Boulenger GA (1885). Catalogue of the Lizards in the British Museum (Natural History). Second Edition. Volume I. Geckonidæ ... London: Trustees of the British Museum (Natural History). (Taylor and Francis, printers). xii + 436 pp. + Plates I-XXXII. (Homopholis wahlbergii, p. 191).

Smith A (1849). Illustrations of the Zoology of South Africa; Consisting Chiefly of Figures and Descriptions of the Objects of Natural History Collected during an Expedition into the Interior of South Africa, in the Years 1834, 1835, and 1836; Fitted out by "The Cape of Good Hope Association for Exploring Central Africa:" Together with a Summary of African Zoology, and an Inquiry into the Geographical Ranges of Species in that Quarter of the Globe. [Volume III. Reptilia.] London: Lords Commissioners of her Majesty's Treasury. (Smith, Elder and Co., printers). Plates with unnumbered pages of text. (Geko wahlbergii, new species, Plate 75).

wahlbergii
Reptiles of Zimbabwe
Reptiles described in 1849